Ten Stories About Smoking is the debut short story collection by writer Stuart Evers.

References

2011 short story collections
British short story collections
Debut books
Short stories about drugs
Smoking
Picador (imprint) books
2011 debut works